Burley Park railway station in Leeds, West Yorkshire, England, is the first stop on the Harrogate Line,  north west of Leeds railway station towards Harrogate and York. The station was opened on 28 November 1988 by British Rail.

The line is heavily used by commuters into Leeds.  It is also near the Headingley Stadium for rugby and cricket fans when Headingley station is busy.

It is near to the districts of Burley, Hyde Park and the southern end of Headingley. The journey time to Headingley station is 2 minutes, and around 5 minutes to Leeds station, which is typically much faster than driving or taking the bus. This station is near to main bus routes on Cardigan Road, Burley Road and Kirkstall Road, and parking is limited to the surrounding streets.

The station occasionally plays the role of Hotten railway station in the TV series Emmerdale.

History
A station named Royal Gardens existed on the site of the current station, serving the southern entrance of the Leeds Zoological and Botanical Gardens. This halt closed in 1858 with the zoo.

Facilities
The station is not staffed and has no ticket office. A ticket machine is available on the East side only (direction of Leeds railway station). Revenue protection staff are sent to the station to sell tickets at rush hours and when events are held at Headingley stadium.  Shelters and digital information screens are located on each platform and both have step-free access from the street. The station does not operate PERTIS or Promise to Pay machines. Due to the close proximity to Leeds, the station is a Penalty fare station.

Services

There is a half-hourly daytime service towards Leeds (southbound) and Harrogate/Knaresborough northbound on Mondays to Saturdays (dropping to hourly in the evening).  Alternate northbound trains continue through to York and additional services run at peak times on weekdays.  On Sundays there is now a similar frequency to that operated on weekdays (half hourly to Leeds and Harrogate/Knaresborough, hourly beyond to York) since the December 2017 timetable change.

Due to the number of stops to York it is generally quicker to travel via Leeds when travelling to York, as an express service via Cross Gates and Garforth is then available.

References

External links

Railway stations in Leeds
DfT Category F1 stations
Railway stations opened by British Rail
Railway stations in Great Britain opened in 1988
Northern franchise railway stations